= Zhang Xiantu =

Chinese women's rights activist

- Born: 1926
- Died: November 12, 2015 (aged 88–89)

Zhang Xiantu (1926 – 2015) was a Chinese women's rights activist. Xiantu was a former comfort woman; together with Wan Aihua, they were the first in China to come out and sue the Japanese government for covering up the sexual violence committed by the Japanese army during the Second Sino-Japanese War.

== Life ==
=== Comfort woman ===
At 16 years old, a few months after her marriage, Xiantu was forcibly taken from her home to the military brothel. She was confined and raped everyday by multiple men and was physically tortured for rejecting their sexual demands.

Xiantu's family sold their valuables and borrowed money and therefore was able to trade her back after 20 days. Apart from the psychological trauma, Xiantu suffered from gynecological diseases. Due to the stigma associated with multiple rape victims, she was ostracized by her husband and in-laws. She then decided to stay at her father's house to recover. She returned, as necessitated, to her husband after two years. Her husband suffered from severe PTSD so Xiantu bore the responsibility of managing the household.

=== Activism ===
In 1995, Xiantu filed a lawsuit at the Tokyo court against the Japanese government for the sexual atrocities committed by their military during the war. Xiantu sought for apology and compensation of victims. She was consistent, and in 2009, the Japanese government issued an apology but rejected the compensation. Since then, Xiantu had been persistent in campaigning for the rights and destigmatization of victims of sexual assault.

== Death ==
Xiantu died on November 12, 2015, in Shanxi after a long-time struggle with gynecological illnesses. She was 89 years old. On her deathbed, she sought for the continuation of the campaign for remaining sexual violence survivors from the war.
